McKenzie & Co. is a full-motion video CD-ROM dating sim game released by Her Interactive in 1995, designed to be played by girls. It was available for Windows 3.1, Windows 95 and Mac OS. A 3DO Interactive Multiplayer version was planned but never released. "McKenzie" is the name of the protagonist's Geo Tracker—an acronym of Marvelous, Cool, Kinetic movement, Ever-lasting friendship, Non-conformist, Zany, Ingenious, and Empowered.

Development
The game was developed with the active involvement of the Albuquerque Independent School District. Through the district, American Laser Games' vice-president of marketing Patricia Flannigan distributed surveys, conducted interviews, and held play study groups in order to design a game that her daughters would play.

The game included a music CD featuring several bands from New Mexico, such as Poet, Cool Notes, Tee Green from the UK, and the Strawberry Zots, whose music video "And You" was also included. Music tracks from composer Jean Rene De Rascon were also included.

Gameplay
The plot revolves around being a high school junior and trying to find a date for the prom. At the beginning of the game, the player chooses between being one of two playable characters. Kim is a cheerleader and Carly is an actress. The opening scene is in the character's bedroom, where all six members of McKenzie & Co are having a sleepover. They look through the yearbook and then ask the player to choose between two guys. For Kim, the choice is between Brett and Steven, while Carly chooses between Derrick and Brandon. The rest of the game is spent trying to get the designated love interest to ask the player character to the prom.

Both characters have their own rooms in the game where they can read magazines, read their diaries, listen to voice messages, call people, apply makeup, or put on clothes.

When they are away from their rooms, the rest of the gameplay is through short video clips. The player must choose an option of what to do or say at the given time, and the videos will show the outcome. Some choices will lead to the same eventual path as others, and some choices will result in a game over.

At the end of the game, if all goes well, the player's date will pick them up and the gameplay will finish with the school yearbook, where the player can see a picture of the player character and their date at prom.

Locations
There are 16 different locations accessible in this game, all within Bay City. There are four separate areas of town, each with four unique locations. Most locations are only accessible at certain points in the game.

Northridge
Madison High School - All teenage characters in the game attend this school. It is mandatory that the character attend class on certain days or they are 'grounded' and it is game over. There are five classes that can be attended in the game: music, art, math, science, and English.
Home
Nelsons' - Derrick Nelson's home. This location is closed for the majority of the game, unless there is a party.
Bartons' - A family that Kim and Carly babysit for.

Westside
Oyster Bay
Halsey's Farm - Brett Halsey's family farm. This location is closed unless the player is playing as Kim and is invited to a party there.
Baseball field
Oyster Bay Arcade - Howie Hooper works here. All mini-games can be accessed through the arcade.

Eastside
Mario's Dining
Community Center
Hospital
Chuck's Drive-In

Downtown
Bay View Mall - There are five stores accessible: Elsa Ross, Oshman's, Limited Too, Trick Rider, and Sam & Libby's. The player picks out clothes in the store and Kim or Carly will try them on in front of a mirror. If the characters have enough money from their job, they can buy them and add them to the closet at their home.
Under 21 Club
Work - Kim works at Sam & Libby's at the mall, Carly works at a movie theatre.
TopHit CD's

Aside from these locations, there is a formal wear store where the player character must go to buy a dress for the prom.

Reaction
Although major publishers declined to distribute the title, because they didn't believe there was a market for girl-oriented games, the 5-CD game was successful. It sold 40,000 units by early 1998, and over 80,000 copies in its lifetime. An expansion pack, McKenzie & Co: More Friends, featured new male characters James and Aaron. The expansion pack included 3 CDs - an upgrade of the main game and a disc for each new character. 

McKenzie & Co. received a lot of press attention for being one of the few girl-oriented games developed in the United States. Her Interactive was one of the first companies in the United States established to specifically develop games for the female market.

While some think of McKenzie & Co. as an Otome game, a popular category in Japanese markets, it was called a "social adventure" by its creators and classified as such in the majority of US retail outlets.

While American Laser Games, the company that founded Her Interactive, claimed feminist motivations, aspiring to help lead girls down the path of computers and technology, the game was not uniformly well received. Some expressed concerns that it pushed a stereotype of what teenage girls are like, with its emphasis on makeup, shopping, and dating.
The Chicago Tribune called the game's objective, getting a prom date, "rather dubious".
Salon characterized the game as "much-reviled" in 1999.

Characters
Kim
A playable character. Gymnast/Cheerleader.
Carly
The other playable character. Actress.
Bryan
Kim and Carly's best guy friend.
Elizabeth
Kim's best friend. Obsessed with shopping and fashion.
Sam
Carly's best friend. Goes out with Bryan.
McKee
A member of McKenzie & Co.
Trish
A member of McKenzie & Co.
Brett
A potential prom date, cowboy type.
Steven
A potential prom date, 'preppy' type.
Brandon
A potential prom date.
Derrick
A potential prom date.
James
In the expansion only. A potential prom date and rebellious biker.
Aaron
In the expansion only. A potential prom date who is an animal rights activist and vegetarian.

There are 11 other students in the game, aside from the above listed. There are also 5 teachers, all played by the same male actor.

See also
 Dating sim
 American Laser Games

References

Related links
 http://www.csoon.com/issue14/mckenzie.htm —A review
 http://sherigranerray.com/?p=15 —memoir of Sheri Graner Ray, one of the programmers

1995 video games
Adventure games
Cancelled 3DO Interactive Multiplayer games
Classic Mac OS games
Romance video games
Video games developed in the United States
Windows games
Single-player video games
Her Interactive games